Amy Winehouse was an English singer and songwriter. She was best known for her eclectic mix of various musical genres, including soul, jazz, rock and roll and R&B. Winehouse released two albums of original music: Frank (2003) and Back to Black (2006). Frank was originally released by Island Records in October 2003 in the United Kingdom and in November 2007 in the United States. Because of the success of her second album, Frank was later re-issued in the UK in May 2008 and in the US in June 2008. Back to Black was issued under Island Records in Europe, Asia, South America and Australia, and under Universal Republic in the US. Several of Winehouse' singles have charted worldwide, including "Rehab", "You Know I'm No Good", "Back to Black", "Tears Dry on Their Own", and "Valerie".

Winehouse's debut album earned several awards and recognitions, including an Ivor Novello Award for Best Contemporary Song ("Stronger Than Me"), a BRIT Award nomination for Best Female Solo Artist, and an inclusion in Robert Dimery's 2006 book, 1001 Albums You Must Hear Before You Die. Back to Black produced numerous nominations, including two from the BRIT Awards (Best Female Solo Artist and Best British Album), six from the Grammy Awards, four from the Ivor Novello Awards, four from the MTV Europe Music Awards, three from the MTV Video Music Awards, one from the Southbank Awards (Best British Female Artist), three from the World Music Awards, and one each from the Mercury Prize (Album of the Year) and MOBO Awards (Best UK Female). Overall, Winehouse received 24 awards from 60 nominations.

BRIT Awards
The BRIT Awards are the British Phonographic Industry's (BPI) annual pop music awards. Winehouse received one award from eight nominations and two that are posthumous.

Echo Music Awards
The Echo Music Awards are granted every year in Germany by the Deutsche Phono-Akademie (an association of recording companies). The Echo Award is the successor to the Deutscher Schallplattenpreis (German Record Award). Each year's winner is determined by the previous year's sales. The winners in the pop category are announced in March, the winners in the classical category in October. Winehouse won two awards from three nominations.

Elle Style Awards
The Elle Style Awards is an awards ceremony hosted annually by Elle magazine to honor achievement in the fields of style, design, and entertainment. Winehouse received one award from one nomination.

GAFFA Awards

GAFFA Awards (Denmark)
Delivered since 1991, the GAFFA Awards are a Danish award that rewards popular music by the magazine of the same name.

!
|-
| rowspan="3"| 2007
| rowspan="2"| Herself
| Best Foreign Female Act
| 
| style="text-align:center;" rowspan="9"|
|-
| Best Foreign New Act
| 
|-
| "Rehab"
| Best Foreign Song
| 
|-
|}

Grammy Awards
The Grammy Awards are awarded annually by the National Academy of Recording Arts and Sciences of the United States for outstanding achievements in the record industry. Often considered the highest music honor, the awards were established in 1958. Winehouse received six awards from eight nominations, the last of which was
received posthumously.

Note: The documentary film Amy (2015), won Best Music Film at the 2016 Grammy Awards. This award is credited to the director Asif Kapadia and the producer James Gay-Rees.

Ivor Novello Awards
The Ivor Novello Awards, named after the Cardiff-born entertainer Ivor Novello, are awards for songwriting and composing. The "Ivors" are presented annually in London by the British Academy of Composers and Songwriters, and were first introduced in 1955. Ceremonies take place each May and are sponsored by PRS for Music (previously The Performing Right Society). They are respected worldwide as the major platform for recognizing and rewarding Britain's songwriting and composing talents. The Award itself is a solid bronze sculpture of Euterpe – the muse of lyric poetry. Winehouse received three awards from five nominations.

Mercury Prize
The Mercury Prize, formerly the Mercury Music Prize and currently known as the Nationwide Mercury Prize for sponsorship reasons, is an annual music prize awarded for the best album from the United Kingdom or Ireland. It was established by BPI and BARD (the British Association of Record Dealers) in 1992 as an alternative to the industry-dominated BRIT Awards. The awards usually take place in September, but nominated albums are announced in July. Nominations are chosen by a selected panel of musicians, music executives, journalists and other figures in the music industry in the UK and Ireland. Winehouse received two nominations.

Meteor Music Awards
The Meteor Music Awards are the national music awards of Ireland, held every year since 2001 and promoted by MCD Productions. Winehouse received one award from one nomination.

MOBO Awards
The MOBO Awards (MOBO being an acronym for Music of Black Origin), established in 1995 by Kanya King MBE and Andy Ruffell (former BMX Superstar and DanceStar Awards founder who left after the show peaked in 2001), are held annually in the United Kingdom to recognize artists of any race or nationality performing black music. Winehouse received one award from six nominations.

MOJO Awards
MOJO Awards are awarded by the popular British music magazine, Mojo, published monthly by Bauer. Winehouse received one award from three nominations.

MTV Europe Music Awards
The MTV Europe Music Awards were established in 1994 by MTV Networks Europe to celebrate the most popular music videos in Europe. Originally an alternative to the American MTV Video Music Awards, the MTV Europe Music Awards is today a popular celebration of what MTV viewers consider the best in music. Most of the awards are voted for by the viewers. The awards are presented annually and broadcast live on MTV Europe, MTV and most of the international MTV channels as well as online. Winehouse received one award from four nominations.

MTV Video Music Awards
The MTV Video Music Awards were established in the end of the summer of 1984 by MTV to celebrate the top music videos of the year. Originally beginning as an alternative to the Grammy Awards, the MTV Video Music Awards is now a respected pop culture awards show in its own right. Normally known as the Best Female Video category, in 2007 the title was briefly changed to Female Artist of the Year. Winehouse received three nominations.

MTV Video Music Brazil
The MTV Video Music Brazil (VMB) was established by MTV Brasil in 1995. Amy Winehouse has received from two nominations.

|-
| align="center"|2007
|Amy Winehouse
|International Artist 
|
|-
| align="center"|2008
|Amy Winehouse
|International Artist 
|
|-

mtvU Woodie Awards
mtvU is a division of MTV Networks that broadcasts a 24-hour television channel that is available on more than 750 college and university campuses across the United States. A Viacom-owned channel, mtvU provides an alternative to standard music television for college students, and gives advertisers and music promotion companies access to college-age viewers, a valuable but traditionally difficult-to-reach demographic group. mtvU also has its own annual awards show, the mtvU Woodie Awards, where winners are determined by online voting. Winehouse was nominated once.

NME Awards
The NME Awards are an annual music awards show founded by the music magazine NME. Winehouse received two awards from six nominations.

NRJ Music Awards
Winehouse was nominated twice.

Popjustice £20 Music Prize
The Popjustice £20 Music Prize is an annual prize awarded by a panel of judges organized by music Web site Popjustice to the singer(s) of the best British pop single of the past year. To qualify, a single must be by (a) British artist(s) and have been released within the 12 months before the award nominations in July. Winehouse received one award from one nomination.

Premios 40 Principales
Premios 40 Principales is an awards ceremony hosted annually by the Spanish radio channel Los 40 Principales. Winehouse was nominated once.

|-
| align="center"| 2008
| Amy Winehouse
| Best Non-Spanish International Artist
| 
|-
| align="center"| 2008
| Rehab
| Best Non-Spanish International Song
|

Q Awards
The Q Awards are the UK's annual music awards run by the music magazine Q to honor musical excellence. Winners are voted by readers of Q online, with others decided by a judging panel. Winehouse received one award from one nomination.

Teen Choice Awards
The Teen Choice Awards is an awards show presented annually by Fox. The program honors the year's biggest achievements in music, movies, sports, and television, as voted on by teenagers aged 13–19. The program usually features a high number of celebrities and musical performers. Winehouse was nominated once.

Soul Train Music Awards

Urban Music Awards
The Urban Music Awards is a British awards ceremony launched in 2003 to recognize the achievement of urban-based artists, producers, nightclubs, DJ's, radio stations, and record labels. Winehouse received one award from two nominations.

Vibe Awards
The Vibe Awards are sponsored annually by Vibe, a monthly magazine launched in 1993 by founder Quincy Jones and funded by Time Inc. The publication predominantly features R&B and hip-hop music artists, actors, and other entertainers. Winehouse was nominated once.

Virgin Media Music Awards

Vodafone Live Music Awards
The Vodafone Live Music Awards are awarded annually by mobile telecommunications company Vodafone to celebrate live music. Winehouse received one award from two nominations.

World Music Awards
The World Music Awards, founded in 1989, is an international awards show that annually honors recording artists based on their worldwide sales figures, which are provided by the International Federation of the Phonographic Industry (IFPI). Winehouse received one award from three nominations.

Other recognitions
2006 – Frank is included in Robert Dimery's book, 1001 Albums You Must Hear Before You Die
2007 – Greatest Britons honored Winehouse with a Musical Achievement award
2007 – Winehouse won the South Bank Show Award for Best Pop
 2008 – Entertainment Weekly'''s 100 Best Albums of the Last 25 Years included Back to Black  at # 9
2009 – Guinness World Records recognized Winehouse as having the Most Grammy Awards Won by a British Female Act
2009 – Winehouse's performance at the 2008 Grammy Awards was nominated as "the U.K.'s most important creative business moment of 2008"
2009 – NME ranked Back to Black'' No. 27 on their list of the "100 Greatest Albums of the Decade"

References

External links
 Amy Winehouse's official site

Awards and nominations
Winehouse, Amy
Winehouse, Amy